Truxno is a village in Union Parish, Louisiana, United States. Because the area is incorporated into Marion, its population is unknown, as its census information has not yet been publicly released.

Major highways
 Louisiana Highway 549

Villages in Louisiana
Villages in Union Parish, Louisiana
Populated places established in 2014
Villages in Monroe, Louisiana metropolitan area
2014 establishments in Louisiana